William Hardy McNeill (October 31, 1917 – July 8, 2016) was an American historian and author, noted for his argument that contact and exchange among civilizations is what drives human history forward, first postulated in The Rise of the West (1963). He was the Robert A. Millikan Distinguished Service Professor Emeritus of History at the University of Chicago, where he taught from 1947 until his retirement in 1987.

Early life and education
William McNeill was born in Vancouver, British Columbia, Canada, the son of theologian and educator John T. McNeill, where he lived until age ten. The family then moved to Chicago, while spending summers on a family farm on Canada's Prince Edward Island.

He earned a Bachelor of Arts degree in 1938 from the University of Chicago, where he was editor of the student newspaper and "was inspired by the anthropologist Robert Redfield". He earned a Master of Arts degree in 1939, also at the University of Chicago, and wrote his thesis on Thucydides and Herodotus. He began working towards a Ph.D. in history at Cornell University under Carl L. Becker. In 1941, he was drafted into the U.S. Army and served in World War II in the European theater. After the war, he returned to Cornell for his Ph.D., which he earned in 1947.

Career

Teaching
In 1947, McNeill began teaching at the University of Chicago, where he remained throughout his teaching career. He chaired the university's Department of History from 1961 to 1967, establishing its international reputation. During his tenure as chair, he recruited Henry Moore to cast a bronze statue called Nuclear Energy commemorating the University of Chicago as the place where the world's first manmade nuclear chain reaction took place in 1942.

In 1988 he was a visiting professor at Williams College, where he taught a seminar on The Rise of the West. He has stated that teaching "is the most wonderful way to learn things". According to John W. Boyer, the University of Chicago's Dean and a former student of McNeill's, McNeill was "one of the most important historians to teach at the University of Chicago in the twentieth century". He retired from teaching in 1987 and moved to Colebrook, Connecticut.

Writing
McNeill's best-known work is The Rise of the West: A History of the Human Community, which was published in 1963, relatively early in his career. The book explored world history in terms of the effect different old world civilizations had on one another, and cites the deep influence of Western civilization on the rest of the world to argue that societal contact with foreign civilizations is the primary force in driving historical change. It had a major impact on historical theory by emphasizing cultural fusions, in contrast to Oswald Spengler's  view of discrete, independent civilizations. Hugh Trevor-Roper wrote a glowing review in The New York Times Book Review. McNeill's Rise of the West won the U.S. National Book Award in History and Biography in 1964.

From 1971 to 1980, he served as the editor of The Journal of Modern History. His Plagues and Peoples (1976), was an important early contribution to the study of the impact of disease on human history. In 1982, he published The Pursuit of Power, which examined the role of military forces, military technology, and war in human history. In 1989 he published a biography of his mentor Arnold J. Toynbee.

In a 1992 review, he disagreed with Francis Fukuyama's argument in The End of History and the Last Man that the end of the Cold War meant that the American model of a capitalist liberal democracy had become the "final form of human government", as Fukuyama put it. In 1997 he disagreed with the central thesis of Jared Diamond's Guns, Germs, and Steel for overlooking the importance of human "cultural autonomy" in determining human development versus Diamond's focus on environmental factors. In 2003, he coauthored The Human Web: A Bird's-eye View of World History with his son and fellow historian J. R. McNeill.

Awards and honors
In addition to being elected to the American Academy of Arts and Sciences and winning the U.S. National Book Award in History and Biography in 1964 for The Rise of the West, McNeill received several other awards and honors. He was elected to the American Philosophical Society in 1977. In 1985 he served as president of the American Historical Association. In 1996, McNeill won the prestigious Erasmus Prize, which the Crown Prince of the Netherlands Willem-Alexander presented to him at Amsterdam's Royal Palace. In 1999, Modern Library named The Rise of the West one of the 100 Best Nonfiction Books of the 20th century.

In 2009, he won the National Humanities Medal. In February 2010, President Barack Obama, a former University of Chicago instructor himself, awarded McNeill the National Humanities Medal to recognize "his exceptional talent as a teacher and scholar at the University of Chicago and as an author of more than 20 books, including The Rise of the West: A History of the Human Community (1963), which traces civilizations through 5,000 years of recorded history".

Personal life
In 1946 McNeill married Elizabeth Darbishire, whom he met during his military service during World War II as an assistant military attaché to the Greek and Yugoslavian governments-in-exile in Cairo. She died in 2006. McNeill himself died in July 2016 at the age of 98.

Works
 (1947).  
 (1949). History of Western Civilization: A Handbook. Chicago: University of Chicago Press.  6th edition, 1986.  .
 (1953)   "America, Britain and Russia, Their Co-operation and Conflict, 1941–1946, Oxford University Press, under the auspices of the Royal Institute of International Affairs, reprinted by Johnson Reprint Corporation, 1970 
 (1954)   Past and Future.  Chicago:  University of Chicago Press.
"The Introduction of the Potato into Ireland," The Journal of Modern History Vol. 21, No. 3, September 1949
 (1963). The Rise of the West: A History of the Human Community. Chicago: University of Chicago Press.  Revised edition, 1991.  .
 (1964). Europe's Steppe Frontier: 1500–1800. Chicago: University of Chicago Press. 
 (1973). "The Ecumene: Story of Humanity". Harper & Row. 
 (1974). The Shape of European History. Oxford: Oxford University Press. 
 (1974). Venice: The Hinge of Europe, 1081–1797. Chicag University of Chicago Press. .
 (1976). Plagues and Peoples. Garden City, NY: Anchor Press/Doubleday. .
 (1978). The Metamorphosis of Greece Since World War II . (University of Chicago Press).
 (1979). 
 (1980). The Human Condition: An Ecological and Historical View. Princeton: Princeton University Press.  
 (1982). The Pursuit of Power: Technology, Armed Force, and Society since A.D. 1000.  Chicago: University of Chicago Press.  
 (1984). "Command vs market: Across the centuries", In: Craig. E. Aronoff, John L. Ward, dir. "The Future of Private Enterprise", Vol 1, Atlanta: Georgia State University, pp81-94
 (1989). Arnold J. Toynbee: A Life. Oxford: Oxford University Press. 
 (1991). Hutchins' University.  A Memoir of the University of Chicago. 1929–1950.  Chicago: University of Chicago Press. 
 (1992). The Global Condition: Conquerors, Catastrophes, & Community. Princeton: Princeton University Press. 
 (1995). Keeping Together in Time: Dance and Drill in Human History.  Cambridge: Harvard University Press. 
 (1998). A World History. Oxford: Oxford University Press; 4th edition. (First published 1967). 
 (2003). The Human Web: A Bird's-Eye View of World History (with J. R. McNeill). New York: W. W. Norton. 
 (2005). Berkshire Encyclopedia of World History (with Jerry H. Bentley, David Christian et al., editors). 5 volumes. Great Barrington, MA: Berkshire Publishing Group. .
 (2005). The Pursuit of Truth: A Historian's Memoir. Lexington: University Press of Kentucky. 
 (2009). Summers Long Ago: On Grandfather's Farm and in Grandmother's Kitchen. Great Barrington, MA: Berkshire Publishing Group. .
 (2011). Berkshire Encyclopedia of World History, 2nd Edition (with Jerry H. Bentley, David Christian et al., editors). 6 volumes. Great Barrington, MA: Berkshire Publishing Group. .

References
Notes

External links

 The MESA Debate: The Scholars, the Media, and the Middle East, video from the debate November 22, 1986, Boston MA. Participants: Bernard Lewis, Edward Said, Leon Wieseltier and Christopher Hitchens. The chairman: William H. McNeill
 The Changing Shape of World History, William H. McNeill, Paper originally presented at the History and Theory World History Conference, March 25–26, 1994.
 Decline of the West?, William H. McNeill, Review of Samuel P. Huntington's The Clash of Civilizations and the Remaking of World Order. The New York Review of Books. January 9, 1997.
  – joint review of four books including two by McNeill
 McNeill, William H. "Discrepancies among the Social Sciences." Conspectus of History 1.7 (1981): 35–45.

 
 
Guides to the William H. McNeill Papers 1963–1991 at the University of Chicago Special Collections Research Center

1917 births
2016 deaths
United States Army Air Forces personnel of World War II
Canadian emigrants to the United States
Canadian male non-fiction writers
National Book Award winners
National Humanities Medal recipients
Presidents of the American Historical Association
Theorists on Western civilization
University of Chicago faculty
University of Chicago Laboratory Schools alumni
World system scholars
Writers from Vancouver
20th-century Canadian historians
20th-century Canadian male writers
21st-century American historians
Cornell University alumni
Members of the American Philosophical Society
World historians